Dutch symphonic metal band Within Temptation have released seven studio albums, three live albums, four extended plays and 26 singles.

Albums

Studio albums

Live albums

Compilation albums

Video albums

Extended plays

Singles

Promotional singles

Music videos

Other appearances

Footnotes

References 

Discographies of Dutch artists
Heavy metal group discographies
discography